The Emblem of Himachal Pradesh is the official state seal used by the Government of Himachal Pradesh and is carried on all official correspondences made by State of Himachal Pradesh. It was adopted by the Government of Himachal Pradesh at the establishment of the state on 25 January 1971. The State of Himachal Pradesh has an Emblem consisting of a mountain ridge over three white fesses, charged with the Aśoka capital.

Design

The design depicts the Lion Capital of Ashoka superimposed on a semi-circular blue background with snow-capped mountain peaks and three white stripes at the bottom.

Former princely states in Himachal Pradesh

Government banner

The government of Himachal Pradesh can be represented by a banner depicting the emblem of the state on a white background.

See also
 National Emblem of India
 List of Indian state emblems

References

Himachal Pradesh
Himachal Pradesh
1971 establishments in India
Government of Himachal Pradesh
Symbols introduced in 1971